Dr. Jack O'Connor was a Canadian football player and coach who was the head coach of Toronto Argonauts from 1923-1925.

References

Sportspeople from Ontario
Canadian football running backs
Toronto Argonauts players
Toronto Argonauts coaches
Year of birth missing
Year of death missing